Coleg Gwent is Wales' largest further education college at various locations in the former county of Gwent, South Wales.

It has 24,000 students ranging from secondary school leavers to mature students. A wide range of part-time and full-time academic and vocational courses are on offer at the college.

[] Coleg Gwent - official website.

Campuses 

The college operates from five campuses – City of Newport, Crosskeys, Usk and Blaenau Gwent Learning Zone in Ebbw Vale, and a £24 million purpose built campus situated in the heart of Cwmbran ‘Torfaen Learning Zone’ is the home for all post 16 education in the Torfaen borough.

There are also two 'Learn-IT' centres, based in Monmouth and Cwmbrân. These offer flexible, drop-in courses on a range of Information Technology subjects as well as marketing, maths, English language and Welsh language.

The college's administrative headquarters are located at the Usk campus.

Pontypool campus is now closed.

Collaboration 

The college works in collaboration with the five local education authorities in South East Wales to provide an extensive curriculum designed to meet the needs of learners of all ages.

Student support 

Coleg Gwent has a range of learner services to help support students. These include a library and computer and information resources and a Students' Union.

Vocational training 

The college also has a range of vocational training facilities. These include a training restaurant and hair and beauty salons at the Crosskeys campus (virtual tour available), Ebbw Vale, Newport and Pontypool. There are also workshops for students studying engineering and construction.

In addition, Usk campus offers agricultural courses and has a working farm (virtual tour available), equestrian centre and animal care centre on its premises.

References

External links
Coleg Gwent website

Further education colleges in Blaenau Gwent
Further education colleges in Caerphilly
Further education colleges in Monmouthshire
Further education colleges in Newport, Wales
Further education colleges in Torfaen
Organisations based in Newport, Wales